The maned wolf (Chrysocyon brachyurus) is a large canine of South America. It is found in Argentina, Brazil, Bolivia, Peru, and Paraguay, and is almost extinct in Uruguay. Its markings resemble those of foxes, but it is neither a fox nor a wolf. It is the only species in the genus Chrysocyon (meaning "golden dog").

Its long, thin legs and dense reddish coat give it an unmistakable appearance. The maned wolf is a crepuscular and omnivorous animal adapted to the open environments of the South American savanna, with an important role in the seed dispersal of fruits, especially the wolf apple (Solanum lycocarpum). The maned wolf is a solitary animal. It communicates primarily by scent marking, but also gives a loud call known as "roar-barking".

This mammal lives in open and semi-open habitats, especially grasslands with scattered bushes and trees, in the Cerrado of south, central-west, and southeastern Brazil; Paraguay; northern Argentina; and Bolivia east and north of the Andes, and far southeastern Peru (Pampas del Heath only). It is very rare in Uruguay, possibly being displaced completely through loss of habitat. The International Union for Conservation of Nature lists it as near threatened, while it is considered a vulnerable species by the Brazilian Institute of Environment and Renewable Natural Resources.

Etymology 
The term maned wolf is an allusion to the mane of the nape. The term lobo, "wolf", originates from the Latin . Guará and aguará originated from tupi-guarani agoa'rá, "by the fuzz". It also is called borochi in Bolivia.

Taxonomy
Although the maned wolf displays many fox-like characteristics, it is not closely related to foxes. It lacks the elliptical pupils found distinctively in foxes. The maned wolf's evolutionary relationship to the other members of the canid family makes it a unique animal.

Electrophoretic studies did not link Chrysocyon with any of the other living canids studied. One conclusion of this study is that the maned wolf is the only species among the large South American canids that survived the late Pleistocene extinction. Fossils of the maned wolf from the Holocene and the late Pleistocene have been excavated from the Brazilian Highlands.

A 2003 study on the brain anatomy of several canids placed the maned wolf together with the Falkland Islands wolf and with pseudo-foxes of the genus Pseudalopex. One study based on DNA evidence  showed that the extinct genus Dusicyon, comprising the Falkland Islands wolf and its mainland relative, was the most closely related species to the maned wolf in historical times, and that about seven million years ago it shared a common ancestor with that genus. A 2015 study reported genetic signatures in maned wolves that are indicative of population expansion followed by contraction that took place during Pleistocene interglaciations about 24,000 years before present.

The maned wolf is not closely related to canids found outside South America. It is not a fox, wolf, coyote or jackal, but a distinct canid; though, based only on morphological similarities, it previously had been placed in the Canis and Vulpes genera. Its closest living relative is the bush dog (genus Speothos), and it has a more distant relationship to other South American canines (the short-eared dog, the crab-eating fox, and the zorros or Lycalopex).

Description

The species was described in 1815 by Johann Karl Wilhelm Illiger, initially as Canis brachyurus. Lorenz Oken classified it as Vulpes cancosa, and only in 1839 did Charles Hamilton Smith describe the genus Chrysocyon. Other authors later considered it as a member of the Canis genus. Fossils of Chrysocyon dated from the Late Pleistocene and Holocene epochs were collected in one of Peter Wilheim Lund expeditions to Lagoa Santa, Minas Gerais (Brazil). The specimen is kept in the South American Collection of the Zoologisk Museum in Denmark. Since no other record exists of fossils in other areas, the species is suggested to have evolved in this geographic region.

The maned wolf bears minor similarities to the red fox, although it belongs to a different genus. Its ears are large and long .

The maned wolf is the tallest of the wild canids; its long legs are likely an adaptation to the tall grasslands of its native habitat. Fur of the maned wolf may be reddish-brown to golden orange on the sides with long, black legs, and a distinctive black mane. The coat is marked further with a whitish tuft at the tip of the tail and a white "bib" beneath the throat. The mane is erectile and typically is used to enlarge the wolf's profile when threatened or when displaying aggression. Melanistic maned wolves do exist, but are rare. The first photograph of a black adult maned wolf was taken by a camera trap in northern Minas Gerais in Brazil in 2013.

The skull can be identified by its reduced carnassials, small upper incisors, and long canine teeth. Like other canids, it has 42 teeth with the dental formula . The maned wolf's rhinarium extends to the upper lip, similar to the bush dog, but its vibrissae are longer. The skull also features a prominent sagittal crest.

The maned wolf's footprints are similar to those of the dog, but have disproportionately small plantar pads when compared to the well-opened digit marks. The dog has pads up to 3 times larger than the maned wolf's footprint. These pillows have a triangular shape. One feature that differentiates the maned wolf's footprint from those of other South American canids is the proximal union of the third and fourth digits.

The maned wolf also is known for the distinctive cannabis-like odor of its territory markings, which has earned it the nickname "skunk wolf".

Genetics
Genetically, the maned wolf has 37 pairs of autosomes within diploid genes, with a karyotype similar to that of other canids.  It has 76 chromosomes, so cannot interbreed with other canids. Evidence suggests that 15,000 years ago, the species suffered a reduction in its genetic diversity, called the bottleneck effect. However, its diversity is still greater than that of other canids.

Ecology and behavior

Hunting and territoriality 
The maned wolf is a twilight animal, but its activity pattern is more related to the relative humidity and temperature, similar to that observed with the bush dog (Speothos venaticus). Peak activity occurs between 8 and 10 am, and 8 and 10 pm. On cold or cloudy days, they can be active all day. The species is likely to use open fields for foraging and more closed areas, such as riparian forests, to rest, especially on warmer days.

Unlike most large canids (such as the gray wolf, the African hunting dog, or the dhole), the maned wolf is a solitary animal and does not form packs. It typically hunts alone, usually between sundown and midnight, rotating its large ears to listen for prey animals in the grass. It taps the ground with a front foot to flush out the prey and pounce to catch it. It kills prey by biting on the neck or back, and shaking the prey violently if necessary. 

The territory is crisscrossed by paths that they create as they patrol at night. Several adults may congregate in the presence of a plentiful food source, for example, a fire-cleared patch of grassland that would leave small vertebrate prey exposed while foraging.

Both female and male maned wolves use their urine to communicate, e.g. to mark their hunting paths or the places where they have buried hunted prey. The urine has a very distinctive odor, which some people liken to hops or cannabis. The responsible substance very likely is a pyrazine, which also occurs in both plants. At the Rotterdam Zoo, this smell once set the police on a hunt for cannabis smokers. The preferred habitat of the maned wolf includes grasslands, scrub prairies, and forests.

Reproduction and lifecycle

Their mating season ranges from November to April. Pups are fully grown when one year old. During that first year, the pups rely on their parents for food.

Data on the maned wolf's estrus and reproductive cycle mainly come from captive animals, particularly about breeding endocrinology. Hormonal changes of maned wolves in the wild follow the same variation pattern of those in captivity. Females ovulate spontaneously, but some authors suggest that the presence of a male is important for estrus induction.

Captive animals in the Northern Hemisphere breed between October and February and in the Southern Hemisphere between August and October. This indicates that photoperiod plays an important role in maned wolf reproduction, mainly due to the production of semen. Generally, one estrus occurs per year. The amount of sperm produced by the maned wolf is lower compared to those of other canids.

Copulation occurs during the four-day estrus period, and is followed by up to 15 minutes of sexual intercourse. Courtship is similar to that of other canids, characterized by frequent approaches and anogenital investigation.

Gestation lasts 60 to 65 days and a litter may have from two to six pups. One litter of seven has been recorded. Birthing has been observed in May in the Canastra Mountains, but data from captive animals suggest that births are concentrated between June and September. The maned wolf reproduces with difficulty in the wild, with a high rate of infant mortality. Females can go up to two years without breeding. Breeding in captivity is even more difficult, especially in temperate parts of the Northern Hemisphere.

Pups are born weighing between 340 and 430 grams. They begin their lives with black fur, becoming red after 10 weeks. The eyes open at about 9 days of age. They are nursed up to 4 months. Afterwards, they are fed by their parents by regurgitation, starting on the third week of age and lasting up to 10 months. Three-month-old pups begin to accompany their mother while she forages. Males and females both engage in parental care, but it is primarily done by the females. Data on male parental care have been collected from captive animals, and little is known whether this occurs frequently in the wild. Maned wolves reach sexual maturity at 1 year of age, when they leave their birth territory.

The maned wolf's longevity in the wild is unknown, but estimates in captivity are between 12 and 15 years. A report was made of an individual at the São Paulo Zoo that lived to be 22 years old.

Diet

The maned wolf is omnivorous. It specialises in preying on small and medium-sized animals, including small mammals (typically rodents and rabbits), birds and their eggs, reptiles, and even fish, gastropods, other terrestrial molluscs, and insects, but a large portion of its diet (more than 50%, according to some studies) is vegetable matter, including sugarcane, tubers, bulbs, roots and fruit. Up to 301 food items have been recorded in the maned wolf's diet, including 116 plants and 178 animal species.

The maned wolf hunts by chasing its prey, digging holes, and jumping to catch birds in flight. About 21% of hunts are successful. Some authors have recorded active pursuits of the Pampas deer. They were also observed feeding on carcasses of run down animals. Fecal analysis has shown consumption of the giant anteater, bush dog, and collared peccary, but whether these animals are actively hunted or scavenged is not known. Armadillos are also commonly consumed. Animals are more often consumed in the dry season.

The wolf apple (Solanum lycocarpum), a tomato-like fruit, is the maned wolf's most common food item. With some exceptions, these fruits make up between 40 and 90% of the maned wolf's diet. The wolf apple is actively sought by the maned wolf, and is consumed throughout the year, unlike other fruits that can only be eaten in abundance during the rainy season. It can consume several fruits at a time and disperse intact seeds by defecating, making it an excellent disperser of the wolf apple plant.

Despite their preferred habitat, maned wolves are ecologically flexible and can survive in disturbed habitats, from burned areas to places with high human influences. Burned areas have some small mammals, such as hairy-tailed bolo mouse (Necromys lasiurus) and vesper mouse (Calomys spp.) that they can hunt and survive on.

Historically, captive maned wolves were fed meat-heavy diets, but that caused them to develop bladder stones. Zoo diets for them now feature fruits and vegetables, as well as meat and specialized extruded diet formulated for maned wolves to be low in stone-causing compounds (i.e. cystine).

Relations with other species
The maned wolf participates in symbiotic relationships. It contributes to the propagation and dissemination of the plants on which it feeds, through excretion. Often, maned wolves defecate on the nests of leafcutter ants. The ants then use the dung to fertilize their fungus gardens, but they discard the seeds contained in the dung onto refuse piles just outside their nests. This process significantly increases the germination rate of the seeds.

Maned wolves suffer from ticks, mainly of the genus Amblyomma, and by flies such as Cochliomyia hominivorax usually on the ears. Interestingly, the maned wolf is poorly parasitized by fleas. The sharing of territory with domestic dogs results in a number of diseases, such as rabies virus, parvovirus, distemper virus, canine adenovirus, protozoan Toxoplasma gondii, bacterium Leptospira interrogans, and nematode Dirofilaria immitis. The maned wolf is particularly susceptible to potentially fatal infection by the giant kidney worm. Ingestion of the wolf apple could prevent maned wolves from contracting this nematode, but such a hypothesis has been questioned by several authors.

Its predators are mainly large cats, such as the puma (Puma concolor) and the jaguar (Panthera onca), but it is most often preyed upon by the jaguar.

Humans
Generally, the maned wolf is shy and flees when alarmed, so it poses little direct threat to humans. Popularly, the maned wolf is thought to have the potential of being a chicken thief. It once was considered a similar threat to cattle, sheep, and pigs, although this now is known to be false.
Historically, in a few parts of Brazil, these animals were hunted for some body parts, notably the eyes, that were believed to be good-luck charms.
Since its classification as a vulnerable species by the Brazilian government, it has received greater consideration and protection.

They are threatened by habitat loss and being run over by automobiles. Feral and domestic dogs pass on diseases to them, and have been known to attack them.

The species occurs in several protected areas, including the national parks of Caraça and Emas in Brazil. The maned wolf is well represented in captivity, and has been bred successfully at many zoos, particularly in Argentina, North America (part of a Species Survival Plan) and Europe (part of a European Endangered Species Programme). In 2012, a total of 3,288 maned wolves were kept at more than 300 institutions worldwide. The Smithsonian National Zoo Park has been working to protect maned wolves for nearly 30 years, and coordinates the collaborative, interzoo maned wolf Species Survival Plan of North America, which includes breeding maned wolves, studying them in the wild, protecting their habitat, and educating people about them.

Conservation 

The maned wolf is not considered an endangered species by the IUCN because of its wide geographical distribution and adaptability to man-made environments. However, due to declining populations, it is classified as a near-threatened species. This decline is mostly due to human activities such as deforestation, increasing traffic in highways resulting in roadkill, and urban growth. Due to the decrease in their habitat, the wolves often migrate to urban regions looking for easier access to food. This increases their contact with domestic animals, as well as the risk of infectious and parasitic diseases amongst the wolves which can lead to death. 

Until 1996 the maned wolf was a vulnerable species by the IUCN. It is also listed in CITES Appendix II, which regulates international trade in the species. The ICMBio list in Brazil that follows the same IUCN criteria considers the wolf to be a vulnerable species. By these same criteria, the Brazilian state lists also consider it more problematic: it is a vulnerable species in the lists of São Paulo and Minas Gerais, while in the lists of Paraná, Santa Catarina and Rio Grande do Sul the maned wolf is considered as "endangered" and "critically endangered" respectively. In Uruguay, although there is no such list as Brazil and IUCN, it is regarded as a species with "priority" for conservation. In Argentina it is not considered to be in critical danger, but it is recognized that its populations are declining and fragmented. The situation of the maned wolf in Bolivia and Paraguay is uncertain. Even with these uncertainties the maned wolf is protected against hunting in all countries.

In Brazil, Argentina, and Uruguay it is forbidden by law to hunt the maned wolf. Conservationists are also taking other steps to ensure its survival, especially as urbanization continues to spread in its natural habitat.

In human cultures 
Human attitudes and opinions about the maned wolf vary across populations, ranging from fear and tolerance to aversion. In some regions of Brazil, parts of the animal's body are believed to help cure bronchitis, kidney disease, and even snake bites. It is also believed to bring good luck. These parts can be teeth, the heart, ears, and even dry stools. In Bolivia, mounting a saddle made of maned wolf leather is believed to protect from bad luck. Despite these superstitions, no large-scale use of parts of this animal occurs.

In urban societies in Brazil, people tend to be sympathetic to the maned wolf, seeing no value in it as a hunting animal or pest. They often consider its preservation to be important, and although these societies associate it with force and ferocity, they do not consider it a dangerous animal. Although popular in some places and common in many zoos, it can go unnoticed. Studies in zoos in Brazil showed that up to 30% of respondents were either unaware or unable to recognize a maned wolf.

It was considered a common animal by the Guarani people, and the first names used by Europeans, such as the Spanish Jesuit missionary Joseph of Anchieta, were the same used by the native peoples (yaguaraçú).  Spanish naturalist Felix de Azara also used the Guarani name to refer to it and was one of the first to describe the biology of the species and consider it an important part of Paraguay's fauna. Much of the negative view of the maned wolf as a poultry predator stems from European ethnocentrism, where peasants often had problems with wolves and foxes.

The maned wolf rarely causes antipathy in the human populations of the places in which it lives, so it has been used as a flag species for the preservation of the Brazilian cerrado. It is represented on the 200-reais banknote, released in September 2020. It has also been represented on the 100-cruzeiros reais coin, which circulated in Brazil between 1993 and 1994.

Gallery

References

Further reading 
  Bandeira de Melo, L. F., M. A. Lima Sábato, E. M. Vaz Magni, R. J. Young, C. M. Coelho (January 2007). "Secret lives of maned wolves (Chrysocyon brachyurus Illiger 1815): as revealed by GPS tracking collars". Journal of Zoology, 271(1). pp. 27–36. .
 Garcia, D., Estrela, G. C., Soares, R. T. G., Paulino, D., Jorge, A. T., Rodrigues, M. A., Sasahara, T. H., & Honsho, C. (2020). "A study on the morphoquantitative and cytological characteristics of the bulbar conjunctiva of the maned wolf (Chrysocyon brachyurus; Illiger, 1815)". Anatomia Histologia Embryologia, 1. .
 Vergara-Wilson, V., Hidalgo-Hermoso, E., Sanchez, C. R., Abarca, M. J., Navarro, C., Celis-Diez, S., Soto-Guerrero, P., Diaz-Ayala, N., Zordan, M., Cifuentes-Ramos, F., & Cabello-Stom, J. (2021). "Canine Distemper Outbreak by Natural Infection in a Group of Vaccinated Maned Wolves in Captivity". Pathogens, 10(1), 51. .

Articles containing video clips
Cerdocyonina
Carnivorans of South America
Fauna of the Cerrado
Extant Late Pleistocene first appearances
Mammals described in 1815
Pleistocene carnivorans
Pleistocene mammals of South America